Nargaroth is a German black metal band led by René "Ash" Wagner, formerly known as “Kanwulf”.

History 
Wagner had earlier claimed that Nargaroth was formed in 1989, the seven-track instrumental demo Orke was released in 1991, and the demo Herbstleyd in 1993. Years later, after many accusations from the international black metal scene, he stated on his website (www.nargaroth.de) that the genesis of Nargaroth was in 1996 after the band Exhuminenz, formed by himself, R.S., Charoon and Darken (not to be confused with Rob Darken of Graveland fame) split up. The aforementioned Nargaroth demo tapes were completed and recorded no earlier than 1998 with the aid of Charoon on guitar and a drum machine. Nargaroth's first album, Herbstleyd (Autumnal Suffering), was released by No Colours Records in December 1998, followed in 2000 by the Amarok compilation of older and unreleased material including the promo version of the song "Herbstleyd" and a Burzum cover, among others. The demo Fuck Off Nowadays Black Metal got released on the same year. This demo is said to be limited to 333 tapes and 100 LPs by the label Sombre Records; it was re-released by No Colours Records on picture LP limited to another 333 copies in 2005.

In 2001, No Colours Records released Black Metal ist Krieg, considered Kanwulf's dedication to black metal. This album spawned countless misconceptions for both the band and artist, most notably being labeled as a Nazi for including photographs of relatives of his that served in the Wehrmacht during WW2, this being meant as a dedication to his deceased family members, regardless of their political affiliations; and being labeled as an avid Burzum supporter for the song "The Day that Burzum Killed Mayhem" which only retells the story of the murder of the Mayhem leader Euronymous by the hands of the Burzum sole member, Count Grishnackh. It was followed in 2002 by Rasluka Part II, which along with Rasluka Part I, is dedicated to the memory of R.S. whose suicide in 1995 greatly affected Wagner. The third album, Geliebte des Regens (Beloved of the Rain), was recorded in the same sessions as the Rasluka series and got released in 2003. 2004 saw the release of the live album Crushing Some Belgian Scum, Rasluka Part I, and Prosatanica Shooting Angels. This last release was originally intended to be a side project of Wagner's called Prosatanica with the recording being called Shooting Angels. This record has plenty of jokes within it (many of which would go unnoticed by most people for the jokes not being of obvious nature) in both the music, layout and sometimes lyrical content too. The next album Semper Fidelis marked Wagner's parting of his former artistic persona of "Kanwulf" and the genesis and embrace of his new persona, simply "Ash", which has been his nickname since his childhood. This decision was taken as a means to estrange himself from the BM scene, which for the most part never understood his work; thus his new "Ash" persona would work as an artist with very little or rather no regard for any scene. It got released by No Colours Records in 2007 in regular jewel case CD and a box-set limited to 99 hand-numbered copies that included the CD, the double LP version of the album which included several bonus tracks, a DVD titled "Burning Leaf", a T-shirt and other things and personal effect of Wagner himself of which he felt the urge of getting rid of (e.g., the wedding ring of his first marriage).

Wagner played one show in Mexico and Guatemala in 2008.

In 2009, the album Jahreszeiten (Seasons) got released on A5 digibook version and double LP. The vinyl version contains spoken intros to each song, these intros are not included in the CD version. In 2009, he engaged in a full tour of South America and in 2010 he toured most of Central America (Guatemala, El Salvador and Honduras) and gave a few extra shows in Colombia and Venezuela.

Spectral Visions of Mental Warfare was released in 2011 and Era of Threnody in 2017.

René Wagner 
René Wagner classifies his music as "German Hateful and Misanthropic Metal", not as black metal; he does so as he claims black metal is mainly influenced by Satanism whereas Nargaroth is not. Despite Wagner's denial, as the music resembles classic black metal and the emotional background and influence being an essence of black metal, Nargaroth is often seen as a black metal band.

While interviewed by "Magacinum ab ovo", Wagner said he sees Nazism as a mental restriction and that he had no fascist ideas because he was a supporter of the Kriegsgräberfürsorge, a German organization caring for graves of soldiers similar to the Commonwealth War Graves Commission, and the MIA International.

Discography 
 Orke (demo, 1998)
 Herbstleyd (demo, 1998)
 Herbstleyd (1998)
 Amarok (2000)
 Fuck Off Nowadays Black Metal (demo, 2000)
 Black Metal ist Krieg (2001)
 Rasluka Part II (2002)
 Geliebte des Regens (2003)
 Crushing Some Belgian Scum (live, 2004)
 Rasluka Part I (2004)
 Prosatanica Shooting Angels (2004)
 Semper Fidelis (2007)
 Semper Fidelis Boxset (2007)
 Jahreszeiten (2009)
 Spectral Visions of Mental Warfare (2011)
 Black Metal Manda, Hijos de Puta (live, 2012)
 Era of Threnody (2017)
 Pekenau do Jotinha (2069)

References

External links 
 
 

German black metal musical groups
Musical groups established in 1996
One-man bands